La desalmada (English title: Heartless) is a Mexican telenovela that premiered on Las Estrellas on 5 July 2021. The series is produced by José Alberto Castro. It is an adaptation of the Colombian telenovela La Dama de Troya created by Felipe Forero, Alejandro Torres and Guido Jácome. Livia Brito stars as titular character, alongside José Ron, Eduardo Santamarina, Marjorie de Sousa, and Marlene Favela.

In May 2022, the series was renewed for a second season.

Plot 
The series follows Fernanda Linares (Livia Brito), a woman who only seeks to avenge her husband, murdered on their wedding night, where in addition to this unfortunate event, she is raped. Fernanda's memory is not clear, which leads her to doubt and making mistakes in judgement. When she meets Rafael (José Ron), she falls deeply in love with him, but confuses him with the man who harmed her. Over time, as her memory clears up, she realizes her error and that it was not Rafael, but his father, who ruined her life.

Cast

Main 
 Livia Brito as Fernanda Linares
 José Ron as Rafael Toscano
 Eduardo Santamarina as Octavio Toscano
 Marjorie de Sousa as Julia Torreblanca de Gallardo
 Marlene Favela as Leticia Lagos de Toscano
 Azela Robinson as Martina Fernández de Estudillo
 Sergio Basáñez as Germán Gallardo
 Alberto Estrella as Carmelo Murillo
 Kimberly Dos Ramos as Isabela Gallardo
 Gonzalo García Vivanco as Rigoberto Murillo
 Francisco Gattorno as Antonio Estudillo
 Verónica Jaspeado as Juana Durán
 Laura Carmine as Ángela Hinojosa
 Alejandra García as Rosalina Santos
 Julio Vallado as David Estudillo
 Gabriela Zamora as Flor
 Mauricio Abularach as José
 Gaby Mellado as Clara Ochoa
 Gonzalo Vega Jr. as Piero Vázquez
 Cecilia Galliano as Miriam Soler
 Macarena Miguel as Mary Pérez
 Carlos Gatica as Gabriel Rojas
 Claudia Arce as Candela Benítez
 Fiona Muñoz as Sandra Fuentes
 Ana Martín as Pachita Pérez
 José Montini as Moreno
 Raúl Araiza as Luis Vázquez
 Daniel Elbittar as César
 Jackie Sauza as Brenda

Guest stars 
 Yahir as Santiago Ramírez
 Espinoza Paz as himself

Production 
The telenovela was announced on 15 October 2020 at Televisa's Visión21 upfront. The main cast was revealed on 11 March 2021. Production began on 17 March 2021, and ended on 21 August 2021. On 17 May 2022, TelevisaUnivision confirmed that the series had been renewed for a second season.

Episodes

Reception

Ratings 
 
}}

Awards and nominations

Notes

References

External links 
 

2021 telenovelas
2021 Mexican television series debuts
2020s Mexican television series
Televisa telenovelas
Mexican telenovelas
Spanish-language telenovelas
Mexican television series based on Colombian television series